Oh Those Glorious Old Student Days (German: O alte Burschenherrlichkeit) may refer to:

 , a popular university song drinking song written in 1825; see Robert Leonhardt
 Oh Those Glorious Old Student Days (1925 film), a German silent film
 Oh Those Glorious Old Student Days (1930 film), a German sound film